The 2004 Atlantic 10 men's basketball tournament was played from March 10 to March 13, 2004, at the University of Dayton Arena in Dayton, Ohio.  The winner was named champion of the Atlantic 10 Conference and received an automatic bid to the 2004 NCAA Men's Division I Basketball Tournament.  Xavier University won the tournament. The top two teams in each division received first-round byes. Saint Joseph's University entered the tournament undefeated, but lost to Xavier in the quarterfinals. Dayton, Richmond, Saint Joseph's, and Xavier all received bids to the NCAA tournament, with the latter two teams losing in the regional finals.

Bracket

All games played at University of Dayton Arena, Dayton, Ohio* - Overtime

Atlantic 10 men's basketball tournament
Tournament
Atlantic 10 men's basketball tournament
Atlantic 10 men's basketball tournament